Takayuki Koike (born 12 October 1984) is a retired Japanese athlete who specialized in the 400 metres hurdles.

He won the silver medal at the 2002 Asian Junior Championships, the gold medal at the 2005 East Asian Games, the silver medal at the 2005 Summer Universiade and finished eighth at the 2010 IAAF Continental Cup.

His personal best time was 49.23 seconds, achieved in July 2005 in Tokyo.

References

1984 births
Living people
Japanese male hurdlers
Universiade medalists in athletics (track and field)
Universiade silver medalists for Japan
Medalists at the 2005 Summer Universiade